Mariclare Costello (born February 3, 1936) is a retired American television, stage, and movie actress. She is a lifetime member of The Actors Studio. Costello's most notable role was that of Rosemary Hunter Fordwick on the television series The Waltons, from 1972 to 1977. In 1977, after her role on The Waltons, she played matriarch Maggie Fitzpatrick on the short-lived drama show The Fitzpatricks.

Costello was born in Peoria, Illinois and earned a B.A. from Clarke College (Iowa; now Clarke University) and a MFA degree from Catholic University of America (Washington, DC). Her first film appearance was in The Tiger Makes Out (1967). In 1970, she appeared on stage in Harvey at the ANTA Theatre, in New York City. She is also well remembered for her role as a hippie-vampire in the 1971 cult horror film Let's Scare Jessica to Death. In the 1981 Miloš Forman film Ragtime, she portrayed Emma Goldman in a scene that was ultimately deleted from the theatrical release, but still included on the DVD.

Personal life
She was married to actor Allan Arbus until his death in 2013. The couple had one child.

After her acting career, she was an acting professor at Loyola Marymount University in Los Angeles.

Filmography

References

External links
Remembering Jessica: An Interview with Mariclare Costello - July 2011

1936 births
Actors from Peoria, Illinois
Living people
American television actresses
American film actresses
American stage actresses
Actresses from Illinois
20th-century American actresses
Clarke University alumni
Catholic University of America alumni